Lyrical may refer to:
Lyrics, or words in songs
Lyrical dance, a style of dancing
Emotional, expressing  strong feelings
Lyric poetry, poetry that expresses a subjective, personal point of view
Lyric video, a music video in which the song's words are the main element

See also
Lyric (disambiguation)